Monarch is the name of three fictional DC Comics supervillains.  The first Monarch is Hank Hall, formerly Hawk, who later renames himself Extant for the Zero Hour: Crisis in Time crossover event. The second Monarch is a quantum field duplicate of Nathaniel Adam, a U.S. Air Force Captain. The third Monarch is a mentally unstable Captain Atom. Monarch was created by Archie Goodwin, Denny O'Neil, and Dan Jurgens and first appeared in Armageddon 2001 #1 (May 1991).

Hank Hall

Monarch is an oppressive tyrant from a bleak, dystopian Earth in the year A.D. 2030. The people are unhappy with his rule, particularly a scientist named Matthew Ryder, an expert on temporal studies, who is convinced he can use his technology to travel back in time and prevent the maniacal ruler from ever coming to power. He learns that, in 1991, one of Earth's heroes eventually turned evil, eliminated the other superheroes of Earth, and became Monarch, who would conquer the world 10 years later.

Armageddon 2001

Chosen by Monarch to take part in a time-travel experiment, Matthew Ryder travels back to the DC Universe of 1991. Ryder decides to find out who Monarch really was and, if possible, kill him before he can rise to power. As he travels through the rift, his body mutates into a form of living temporal energy, and upon arriving at his destination, he takes the name Waverider.

Although Waverider uses his abilities to look into the possible future(s) of various characters, he cannot pinpoint who will become Monarch. Eventually, however, he accidentally comes into physical contact with Captain Atom, unleashing a storm of temporal energy that opens a gate to the future through which Monarch emerges. Monarch, it seems, has been monitoring Waverider's every move in the past ever since he left the future, and was waiting for the perfect time to travel back and stop Waverider from erasing Monarch from existence.

In a subsequent battle with the Justice League, Monarch retreats, taking Dawn Granger, the current Dove, with him. Hank Hall follows and catches up to him just in time to see Dawn killed in front of his eyes. Being created as two beings whose natures were supposed to be in balance, Hank becomes enraged when his partner's pacifist nature can no longer contain his warlike spirit. He beats the Monarch to death, only to learn the horrible truth: he is the one who will be the Monarch of the future.

Upon seeing Monarch's dead body and the device he is building to enslave humanity, Hank Hall muses that the Earth will need someone to keep the balance, so he puts on Monarch's armor and continues building his machine. Eventually, the Justice League finds him and Captain Atom, feeling guilty that he let Monarch slip through the timestream in the first place, decides to fight him one-on-one. The battle causes Atom's energy and Monarch's suit to clash, creating a portal that sends them both back in time to the Age of Dinosaurs. In the past, Hank and Atom finish the fight. Hank wins by becoming enraged that he is stuck in the past and there is no way either of them can get back. After the fight, Hawk goes into a deep sleep, waiting to wake up in his own timeline.

The reveal of Hank Hall as Monarch led to some controversy amongst the fan community; Monarch was originally intended to be revealed as Captain Atom, with clues in the story pointing towards this which had to be discarded when it was changed at the last minute. This change was due to the premature leaking of Monarch's identity. While Monarch was always supposed to be Captain Atom, this was supposed to be a secret. When Monarch's identity was prematurely leaked, DC decided to preserve the surprise of the story by switching Monarch's identity to that of Hank Hall.

As many fans pointed out, Hawk and Dove Annual #2 had Hank Hall fighting Monarch face to face in 2001 with Hawk being the destroyer of Monarch. Dove allowed Waverider to see a multitude of futures and realize Hawk is Monarch.

Armageddon: The Alien Agenda
After being thrown back to the middle of the Triassic Era, Monarch and Captain Atom encounter hostile aliens who attempt to enlist each one separately and without the other's knowledge, to assist them in destroying the Milky Way Galaxy for their own ends. The two defeat the aliens' plans, and Captain Atom eventually returns to the present, while Monarch's fate is unknown.

Extreme Justice

In an experiment in the 1960s, Nathaniel Adam is housed in a shell of alien metal, under which an atomic bomb is detonated, propelling him into the "quantum field". There, the metal fuses with him, allowing him to survive in the void and giving him a connection to the quantum field. Meanwhile, however, the excess metal forms into a replica of him, which re-enters the timestream in the mid 1980s as Captain Atom, unaware that it is not the original Adam.

In the quantum field, the real Adam meets the original Monarch, Hank Hall, who is revealed to have become trapped there after the events of Armageddon: The Alien Agenda. Adam trains Hall to manipulate the quantum field, enough to allow Hall to gain powers of time travel and escape back into the timestream. In return for helping him escape, Hall sends the Monarch armor back to Nathaniel Adam in the quantum field.

Zero Hour: Crisis in Time!

In the Zero Hour: Crisis in Time! miniseries, Monarch joins forces with renegade Green Lantern Hal Jordan (at this time known as Parallax), in a bid to reshape the timeline of the entire universe. He confronts Waverider and absorbs him and most of his time-warping abilities, giving him the power to travel through time as he pleases, and renames himself Extant. In the course of the battle against Earth's heroes, Extant kills three veteran members of the Justice Society of America: the Atom (Al Pratt), the Hourman (Rex Tyler), and Doctor Mid-Nite (Charles McNider) by ageing them to death.  

Some time after Zero Hour: Crisis in Time!, Extant returns to mount a new attempt to remake reality, by acquiring the fragments of the infinite power of the Worlogog, which was initially entrusted to the android Hourman before he spread it out across time, as its power was too dangerous. Despite Extant remaking the universe, he is defeated when the fragment of the Worlogog Hourman kept for himself creates a subtle flaw in Extant's power, allowing Hourman to share his 'Hour of Power' with the JSA and Metron and tear the Worlogog out on Extant. With his power weakened, Extant is killed while trying to escape when the Atom Smasher, with the aid of Metron, swaps Extant with the Atom Smasher's mother, who had been killed in a plane crash, the weakened Extant dying in the crash and thus keeping the number of bodies found in the aftermath the same as before while saving Rothstein's mother. Some time later, Rex Tyler's death is reversed when the android Hourman takes his place in the timestream and is destroyed instead.

Nathaniel Adam

Extreme Justice (continued)
In the 1990s, Adam uses the Monarch armor to escape the quantum field as the new Monarch. This Monarch claims to be a hero, much to the annoyance of Captain Atom, and is very popular. He is assisted by Justice League International's former UN liaison, Catherine Cobert, with whom Captain Atom once had a relationship.

It is eventually revealed that Monarch's true plan is to control the world via genetic implants he inserts into people under the guise of healing them. This plan is prevented when Booster Gold's future biology proves resistant to the implants. What became of this version of Monarch is unknown.

Captain Atom
In Superman/Batman #6, Captain Atom is blasted to the Wildstorm Universe for the Captain Atom: Armageddon storyline. He returns to the DC Universe during Infinite Crisis, in the Superman/Batman series, and at the end of the miniseries.

During the time period of the 2006 "One Year Later" storylines, Atom is revealed to be contained by the modern day Atomic Knights inside a secret S.H.A.D.E. facility in Blüdhaven, and used to administer radiation treatments to metahumans. Later, in 2008's Countdown, it was revealed that the changes that were to befall Captain Atom in this period were due to the actions of Solomon, one of the newly-born Monitors who attacks Captain Atom almost as soon as he arrives back to New Earth from the Wildstorm Universe and damages his alien metal shell, causing him to leak dangerous amounts of radiation.

The Knights fit Atom with an updated version of the Monarch armor in order to contain the radiation leaking from his breached skin. Captain Atom awakens and breaks free of the facility. He then apparently kills the rampaging Major Force by absorbing his energy, and, after the city has been evacuated, triggers a vast explosion, completely obliterating what was left of Blüdhaven. His mental condition was unknown at that time.

Found by Kyle Rayner in the Bleed, a slightly paranoid Captain Atom, still in the Monarch armor, went to the Bleed to avoid the Monitors' gaze and expanded his knowledge of the apparently rediscovered multiverse.

Captain Atom is first referred to as Monarch by Dan DiDio in an interview for Wizard magazine.

Countdown

Monarch appears in the last panel of Countdown #45. He appears to be observing Forerunner. In his weekly interview on Newsarama.com, Mike Marts revealed that Countdown #44 bears a cover by Ed Benes with the Monarch armor, as in the same issue Monarch manages to sway Forerunner to his side, turning her against the Monitors. 

Since then, Monarch has played a substantial role in Countdown. In the Bleed, he has gathered a colossal army of potentially millions of soldiers from across the Multiverse in order to battle the Monitors. In Countdown to Final Crisis #26, he wishes to unleash a crisis wave which will destroy the multiverse and leave there only one unified reality, ruled by him. Besides foot-soldiers, his army consisted at the very least of the Crime Society of Earth-3, and the JLAx of Earth-10. Initially, he used Forerunner to both train his army and recruit new warriors, but he later abandoned her. He approached Lord Havok of Earth-8 to be his second in command, and while the warlord initially said no, he later appeared to change his mind as he was seen leading Monarch's armada. One of many Countdown spin-offs, the miniseries Lord Havok and the Extremists chronicled this. 

The miniseries Countdown: Arena features Monarch arranging battles between alternate versions of characters throughout the Multiverse to compile the strike team for his new Multiverse army; specifically, one Superman, one Batman, a Wonder Woman, a Green Lantern, a Flash, a Blue Beetle, a Nightshade, a Starman, a Ray and a 10th battle. During the Arena battle, Monarch is attacked by the Captain Atom Brigade, composed of every version of Captain Atom in the Multiverse. After Monarch destroys the Captain Atom Brigade, he absorbs their power and takes his newly formed army to war with the Monitors. In Countdown to Final Crisis #16, he attacks the Monitors gathered on Earth-51. In #14, he is confronted by Superman-Prime. In #13, Superman-Prime fights with Monarch, becoming slightly injured after Monarch exposes part of his suit. In a fit of rage, Superman-Prime redoubles his attack on Monarch and, while his temporarily Oan Guardian-boosted powers begin to fade, he rips open the chest plate of Monarch's containment armor, resulting in a huge explosion of quantum energy that devastates the entire universe of Earth-51. While Superman-Prime was later found lost in time by the Time Trapper and sent to the 31st century, the status of Monarch remained unknown. An amnesiac Captain Atom has resurfaced some time later in Superman's Pal: Jimmy Olsen Special #2 (2009); Action Comics #880 establishes having no memories of his actions during Countdown and has to confront a resurrected Major Force in #883. He subsequently embarks on a path of redemption.

Powers and abilities
The version of Nathaniel Adam/Monarch depicted in the Countdown series was one of the most powerful beings in the DC Universe and was capable of engaging and defeating even vastly powerful foes, such as the Universal Monitors. Monarch's powers stem from his ability to manipulate the quantum field, and he has demonstrated the powers of flight, teleportation (even between different realities), vastly powerful energy projection, manipulation and absorption abilities, vast superhuman strength and invulnerability (Superman's punches did not even faze him), matter absorption and manipulation abilities and vast though vaguely defined awareness.   

So far, the only people that have ever been able to injure Monarch are the Earth-16 Chris Kent (who died after performing such a massive attack) and Superboy-Prime. After absorbing Major Force and every version of Captain Atom in the Multiverse, Monarch's powers are exceedingly strong. He was able to beat three versions of Superman and Wonder Woman at one time in Countdown: Arena with one blow, go toe to toe with a Guardian-charged Superboy-Prime, incinerate Lobo and defeat all of his counterparts, with ease, within a few minutes. Besides his battles with the Guardian-charged Superboy-Prime and the Monitors, Monarch only had the combined power of himself and Major Force when he defeated all of his other opponents. After he absorbed all of his Captain Atom counterparts, his power level did not seem to rise, as he was already vastly powerful.

Equipment
 The original Monarch's armor was crafted using advanced technology from an alternate future, it was highly durable, could fire positronic charges from his eyes and gloves, had a teleportation device, and probably other uncatalogued functions.
 The updated Monarch armor, currently worn by Captain Atom, contains a "nanoweave" designed to contain radiation leaking from a breach in his chest. It also contained instruments for monitoring his vital signs through a direct neural interface.

References

External links
 Unofficial Armageddon 2002 Biography
 DCU Guide: Armageddon 2001
 Hyperboria.org: Waverider
 Fanzing #36 Armageddon 2001: Ten Years Later
 Newsarama - Back to Reign in the DCU: The Return of Monarch?
 Comicon.com: Justin Gray's Forerunner To Adventure

Characters created by Dan Jurgens
Fictional mass murderers
Fictional dictators
DC Comics characters with superhuman strength
DC Comics supervillains
Comics characters introduced in 1991
Characters created by Archie Goodwin (comics)
Characters created by Dennis O'Neil